Le Haut-Banc is a railway station serving the towns Ferques and Rety, in the Pas-de-Calais department, northern France. It is on the Boulogne–Calais railway between Calais and Boulogne and served by regional TER trains.

References

Railway stations in Pas-de-Calais